Krestos is a surname. Notable people with the surname include:

Gebre Krestos, Emperor of Ethiopia
Negasi Krestos, Ruler of Shewa
Newaya Krestos, Emperor of Ethiopia
Yemrehana Krestos, Emperor of Ethiopia

See also 
Yemrehana Krestos Church, Orthodox church located in Amhara Region, northern Ethiopia